Curtis Eugene Cross (born August 14, 1983), better known by his stage name Black Milk, is an American rapper, songwriter, and record producer.

Career
In addition to Slum Village, Black Milk has worked with J Dilla, Elzhi, Phat Kat, Frank-N-Dank, Lloyd Banks, Canibus, Pharoahe Monch, RZA, Danny Brown, Black Thought, T3 and many more throughout his career.

In 2004, Black Milk formed B.R. Gunna with Young RJ and Fat Ray. Together they released Dirty District: Vol. 2, a follow up to a compilation released in 2001 by Slum Village, to which Black Milk had contributed production. In 2005, he released a solo album, Sound of the City, Vol. 1, signing a record contract with Fat Beats Records in 2006 (Fat Beats is currently distributed by Koch Entertainment, the largest independent distributor in the U.S.). In the fall of 2006, he released an EP, titled Broken Wax, and handled most of the production on T3's Olio mixtape. On March 13, 2007, he released his second album, Popular Demand.

Black Milk released an album with Fat Ray entitled The Set Up on March 4, 2008, and his third official solo release "Tronic" on October 28, 2008. He also handled the majority of production on Elzhi's album The Preface, released August 12. (He also produced four of the tracks on Elzhi's "The Leftovers Unmixedtape" project, released on December 11, 2009.)

On December 25, 2009, Black Milk leaked the first single from his upcoming album Album of the Year. The song is called "Keep Going". He also released two more singles named "Welcome (Gotta Go)" and "Deadly Medley" featuring Royce da 5'9" and Elzhi. On August 22, 2010, he released the music video for "Deadly Medley", which featured Royce da 5'9" and Elzhi. On September 14, he released Album of the Year through Fat Beats and Decon.

In March 2011, Black Milk released a 7" single entitled "Brain". The single was the result of a collaboration between Black Milk and his band (AB, Daru Jones and Malik Hunter) and Jack White of the White Stripes. A B-side, titled "Royal Mega", was also released.

On October 15, 2013, Black Milk released his a new album titled No Poison No Paradise, which included features from Black Thought of The Roots, Mel, Robert Glasper, Dwele, Quelle Chris, Ab and Tone Trezure, as well as additional production from Will Sessions.

On March 4, 2014, Black Milk released an entirely self-produced EP titled Glitches in the Break. The project consists of nine previously unreleased tracks and features guest appearances from Guilty Simpson and Fat Ray. A 12" vinyl edition of the EP was made available on Saturday, April 19.

On October 28, 2014, Black Milk released his sixth album titled If There's a Hell Below, features guest appearances by Blu, Bun B, Mel, Ab, Pete Rock, Gene Obey, and Random Axe.

Discography

Studio albums
 Sound of the City (2005)
 Popular Demand (2007)
 Tronic (2008)
 Album of the Year (2010)
 No Poison No Paradise (2013)
 If There's a Hell Below (2014)
 Fever (2018)

EPs
 Broken Wax (2006)
 Synth or Soul (2013)
 Glitches in the Break (2014)
 DiVE (2019)

Collaborative albums
 Dirty District Vol. 2 (with B.R. Gunna) (2004)
 Caltroit (with Bishop Lamont) (2008)
 The Set Up (with Fat Ray) (2008)
 Random Axe (with Sean Price and Guilty Simpson as Random Axe) (2011)
 Black & Brown! (with Danny Brown) (2011)
 Burning Stones (with Mel) (2013)
 The Rebellion Sessions (with Nat Turner) (2016)
 Sunday Outtakes (with Nat Turner) (2016)

References

External links

 
 

1983 births
African-American male rappers
American male rappers
American hip hop record producers
Living people
Songwriters from Michigan
Rappers from Detroit
Underground rappers
21st-century American rappers
21st-century American male musicians
African-American songwriters
21st-century African-American musicians
20th-century African-American people
American male songwriters